Ashayevo (Äşäy) is a rural locality (a village) in Belyankovsky Selsoviet, Belokataysky District, Bashkortostan, Russia. The population was 233 as of 2010. There are 5 streets.

Geography 
Ashayevo is located 33 km northeast of Novobelokatay (the district's administrative centre) by road. Novaya Maskara is the nearest rural locality.

References 

Rural localities in Belokataysky District